Fraserville may refer to:

 Fraserville, Ontario, a community in Peterborough County, Ontario,
 Fraserville, Nova Scotia, a community in Cumberland County, Nova Scotia,
 a historical name for Rivière-du-Loup, Quebec.